Kutrovice is a municipality and village in Kladno District in the Central Bohemian Region of the Czech Republic. It has about 100 inhabitants.

Geography
It lies in an agricultural landscape of the Lower Eger Table. The Bakovský Stream flows through the municipality.

History
The first written mention of Kutrovice is from 1366.

Transport
The main road No. 7 from Prague to Chomutov (part of an unfinished D7 motorway) runs through the municipality.

Sights
Kutrovice lacks any buildings of historical importance, there is only a small Baroque chapel in the municipality.

Gallery

References

External links

Villages in Kladno District